Tupi National High School is a public national high school established in 1966.

The High school changed its name from Tupi Barangay High School when it was converted to a national high school in 1985 through Parliamentary Bill No. 5750.

In 2009, its annex in Barangay Cebuano was separated into an independent national high school called Cebuano National High school through Republic Act 9767.

References 

Schools in South Cotabato
Educational institutions established in 1966
High schools in the Philippines
1966 establishments in the Philippines